Ofo Uhiara (born 13 December 1975) was born in the UK of Nigerian descent and grew up in east London. He is an actor most noted for his role as Police Constable Lance Powell in the ITV soap opera The Bill. He is the brother of actress Ony Uhiara.

External links

English male soap opera actors
Living people
1975 births
English people of Nigerian descent
Male actors from London
21st-century English male actors